Le Pian-Médoc is a commune in the Gironde department in the Nouvelle-Aquitaine region in Southwestern France. It is located northwest of Bordeaux, in the Les Portes du Médoc canton. In 2019, it had a population of 6,890.

Demographics

See also
Communes of the Gironde department

References

Communes of Gironde